is a train station in the city of Matsumoto, Nagano Prefecture, Japan, operated by East Japan Railway Company (JR East).

Lines

Station layout
The station consists of two ground-level opposed side platforms, connected by an elevated station building. The station has a  Midori no Madoguchi staffed ticket office.

Platforms

History
Hirata Station opened on 18 March 2007.

Passenger statistics
In fiscal 2015, the station was used by an average of 1448 passengers daily (boarding passengers only).

Surrounding area

See also
List of railway stations in Japan

References

External links

JR East Hirata Station

Railway stations in Matsumoto City
Railway stations in Japan opened in 2007
Stations of East Japan Railway Company
Shinonoi Line